Digo may refer to:
the Digo people
the Digo language
 Diqo, a village in Azerbaijan